Le Moment was a French language daily newspaper published from Bucharest. The newspaper was founded in 1935 by Alfred Hefter, and according to Emery Reves it was in serious difficulties and about to go under in May 1939. The paper ceased publication in 1940.

References

1935 establishments in Romania
1940 disestablishments in Romania
Defunct newspapers published in Romania
French-language newspapers published in Europe
Newspapers published in Bucharest
Publications established in 1935
Publications disestablished in 1940